Glenn Richard Freeman (July 17, 1933 – June 7, 2014) was an American politician and businessman.

Born in Cumberland, Kentucky, Freeman served in the United States Army and received his bachelor's degree from University of Kentucky. Freeman also went to Cumberland University and Western Kentucky University. He worked in his family's businesses. He served in the Kentucky House of Representatives from 1970 to 1971 and from 1974 to 1977 and then in the Kentucky State Senate from 1996 to 2000 as a Democrat. He died in Corbin, Kentucky.

Notes

1933 births
2014 deaths
People from Cumberland, Kentucky
Cumberland University alumni
University of Kentucky alumni
Western Kentucky University alumni
Businesspeople from Kentucky
Democratic Party members of the Kentucky House of Representatives
Democratic Party Kentucky state senators
20th-century American businesspeople